The Royal Southern Yacht Club is a yacht club in Hamble-le-Rice, Hampshire, England.

History

It was established in 1837 in Southampton as the Royal Southampton Yacht Club and was given Royal patronage by Queen Victoria.  The original Club House, which still stands opposite Southampton's Royal Pier, was built in 1846. Its archives record the annual regattas, the parlous state of its finances through most of the nineteenth century, and the issues of the time. In 1844 the club wanted to organize a large regatta, but having no funds in hand, it decided to increase the entrance fee and the remit of the club. This involved altering its name to "Royal Southern Yacht Club", its present denomination.  In 1947, as Southampton Docks expanded commercially and its waters became less attractive for yachting, the club moved to south-east to Hamble, where it remains today.

See also

List of International Council of Yacht Clubs members
Royal Southampton Yacht Club

References

External links
Royal Southern Yacht Club's webpage

Royal yacht clubs
Sports clubs in Hampshire
Yacht clubs in England
1837 establishments in England
Southern
Sports clubs established in 1837
Organisations based in Hampshire